Harvey Lee Armstrong (born December 29, 1959 in Houston, Texas) is a former  professional American football defensive tackle who played eight seasons in the National Football League for the Philadelphia Eagles and Indianapolis Colts. He played college football at Southern Methodist. 
Armstrong has a daughter, Sidney Floyd (with Jennifer Floyd). Later, he married Sharon McCarthy, and had a second daughter, Madison J. Armstrong.

References

1959 births
Living people
Players of American football from Houston
American football defensive tackles
SMU Mustangs football players
Philadelphia Eagles players
Indianapolis Colts players
Chicago Enforcers coaches
Ed Block Courage Award recipients